George W. "Tank" McLaren (August 29, 1896 – November 13, 1967) was an American football and basketball player and coach.  Playing at the University of Pittsburgh under legendary football coach Pop Warner, McLaren was an All-American in 1917 and 1918.  During his playing career, he was  never stopped for a loss on a running play.   McLaren served as head football coach at Emporia State University, then known as Kansas State Normal College, (1919), the University of Arkansas (1920–1921), the University of Cincinnati (1922–1926), and the University of Wyoming (1927–1929), compiling a career record of 32–55–8.  He also coached basketball at Wyoming for two seasons (1928–1930), tallying a mark of 28–10.  McLaren was inducted into the College Football Hall of Fame as a player in 1965.

Early life
McLaren grew up in Pittsburgh, Pennsylvania where he attended and graduated from Peabody High School.  He played football at Peabody and competed in several other sports including track, basketball, and swimming.

University of Pittsburgh
McLaren attended the University of Pittsburgh, where he was considered one of the greatest all-around athletes that Pitt ever produced.  In addition to being a football All-American, he was also a two-year member of the basketball and track teams.  McLaren played four varsity seasons as fullback at Pittsburgh from 1915 to 1918.  While playing for the Panthers he only lost one game while winning thirty decisions.  He was a member of three national championship-winning teams under head coach Glenn "Pop" Warner. In 1916, the Panthers beat several national powers while not giving up a single point.  During the next two seasons McLaren won All-America honors.  In 1917 season, McLaren helped the Panthers to a 10–0 record.  That season, he established single season school records when he scored 13 touchdowns and rushed for 782 yards including a then record 91-yard touchdown against Syracuse University.

Pitt's undefeated 1917 team was known as "The Fighting Dentists" because on occasion every position was filled by dental students.  The dental students on the 1917 team included McLaren, Katy Easterday, Skip Gougler, "Jake" Stahl, and Jock Sutherland.

In 1918, his senior season, he served as Captain of the Panther football team and was also president of his senior class.  He still ranks among the University of Pittsburgh all-time leaders in both scoring (183 points) and rushing (1,920 yards). One of McLaren's most noted achievements was that he was never stopped for a loss on a running play.

College coach
McLaren was a college football coach from 1919 to 1929.  In 1919, McLaren was named as head football coach at Emporia State University,  then known as Kansas State Normal College,  in Emporia, Kansas.   He got the position based on a recommendation by Pop Warner.  He became 11th head football coach for Emporia State and held that position for just the 1919 season. His overall coaching record at ESU was 1–5–2.  This ranks him 20th at ESU in terms of total wins and 19th at ESU in terms of winning percentage.  He next  served as the head football coach at Arkansas, where he compiled an 8–5–3 record.  As Arkansas head football coach McLaren personally was a very popular coach but was let go because number of wins did not meet expectations.  From 1922 to 1926, he coached at Cincinnati, where he compiled a 16–26–3 record. From 1927 to 1929, he coached at Wyoming, where he compiled a 7–19 record.  His overall record as a head coach is 32–55–8.

After coaching
After his coaching career, McLaren  worked in the industrial relations division of a company in Baltimore.  He was inducted into the National Football Foundation's College Football Hall of Fame in 1965.

Head coaching record

Football

References

External links
 

1896 births
1967 deaths
American football fullbacks
American men's basketball players
Arkansas Razorbacks football coaches
Cincinnati Bearcats football coaches
Emporia State Hornets football coaches
Pittsburgh Panthers football players
Pittsburgh Panthers men's basketball players
Wyoming Cowboys basketball coaches
Wyoming Cowboys football coaches
College men's track and field athletes in the United States
All-American college football players
College Football Hall of Fame inductees
Sportspeople from Pittsburgh
Coaches of American football from Pennsylvania
Players of American football from Pittsburgh
Baseball coaches from Pennsylvania